Daniel Goulet (28 October 1928 – 25 February 2007) was a French politician. He served as a member of the French Senate and the National Assembly representing the department of Orne.

References

1928 births
2007 deaths
Politicians from Normandy
Senators of Orne
Rally for the Republic politicians
Union for a Popular Movement politicians
Members of Parliament for Orne